The gens Lamponia was an obscure plebeian family at ancient Rome, known from only a few individuals.  The most important was Marcus Lamponius, one of the leaders of the allies during the Social War.

Members

 Marcus Lamponius,{{efn-lr|Aponius in Diodorus Siculus.<ref>Dictionary of Greek and Roman Biography and Mythology, vol. II, p. 715 ("Marcus Lamponius").</ref>}} a native of Lucania, was one of the Italian commanders during the Social War.  He defeated Publius Licinius Crassus, who was forced to retreat into Grumentum with considerable losses.  He opposed Sulla during the Roman civil war of 82 BC, and prudently disappeared after the Battle of the Colline Gate together with many other persons fleeing the expected persecution.Appian, Bellum Civile, i. 40, 41, 90, 93.Florus, iii. 21.Diodorus Siculus, xxxvii. Eclogue i.
 Marcus Lamponius, mentioned as the father of a Lamponius whose funerary monument is at Maratea in Lucania.  The inscription is doubtful, and perhaps is intended to refer to the Lucanian general.
 Lamponius Verus, inscribed at Savaria in Pannonia Superior.
 Lamponius Verinus, inscribed at Savaria in Pannonia Superior.

Notes

See also
 List of Roman gentes

References

Bibliography
 Lucius Annaeus Florus, Epitome de T. Livio Bellorum Omnium Annorum DCC (Epitome of Livy: All the Wars of Seven Hundred Years).
 Diodorus Siculus, Bibliotheca Historica (Library of History).
 Plutarchus, Lives of the Noble Greeks and Romans.
 Sextus Julius Frontinus, Strategemata (Stratagems).
 Appianus Alexandrinus (Appian), Bellum Civile (The Civil War).
 Eutropius, Breviarium Historiae Romanae (Abridgement of the History of Rome).
 Dictionary of Greek and Roman Biography and Mythology, William Smith, ed., Little, Brown and Company, Boston (1849).
 Theodor Mommsen et alii, Corpus Inscriptionum Latinarum'' (The Body of Latin Inscriptions, abbreviated "CIL"), Berlin-Brandenburgische Akademie der Wissenschaften (1853–present).

Roman gentes